Abdullah Al Mamun may refer to:

 Abdullah al Mamun (playwright), Bangladeshi playwright, actor, and filmmaker
 Abdullah Al Mamun (cricketer), Bangladeshi cricketer playing for Chittagong Division
 Abdullah Al-Mamun Suhrawardy, Bengali Islamic scholar, barrister, and academic
 Chowdhury Abdullah Al-Mamun, Bangladeshi police officer and the incumbent Director General of Rapid Action Battalion (RAB)
 A A Mamun, Bangladeshi physicist

See also 
 Mamun Al Mahtab (Shwapnil), Bangladeshi hepatologist
 Abdullah (disambiguation)